Park Heung-min (born 14 July 1978) is a South Korean boxer. He competed in the men's featherweight event at the 2000 Summer Olympics.

References

1978 births
Living people
South Korean male boxers
Olympic boxers of South Korea
Boxers at the 2000 Summer Olympics
Place of birth missing (living people)
Featherweight boxers